is an annual award established to encourage non-Japanese manga artists in 2007. This award was created by Japanese Foreign Minister Tarō Asō, who proposed this award in a policy speech he gave in Tokyo's Akihabara district in 2006. 

The selection is managed by the Ministry of Foreign Affairs of Japan. Annually, award honorees are recommended by the advisers including Machiko Satonaka and many other manga artists.

Winners

2007
146 entries from 26 countries and regions were received

International Manga Award Winner:
 Sun Zi's Tactics by Lee Chi Ching (Hong Kong)

"Shorei" (Commendation) Award:
 1520 by Kai (Hong Kong)
 Hollow Fields by Madeleine Rosca (Australia)
 Le Gardenie by Benny Wong (Malaysia)

2008
368 entries from 46 countries and regions were received

International Manga Award Winner:
 Feel 100% by Lau Wan Kit (Hong Kong)

"Shorei" (Commendation) Award:
 Elapse by Yin Chuan (China)
 “Portrait” by Chezhina Svetlana Igorevna (Russia)
 Okhéania 1 by Alice Picard (France)

Bronze Award

 The strong men game, by Amer Moghrabi (Syria)

2009
303 entries from 55 countries and regions were received

 Gold Award:
 Super Dunker by Jakraphan Huaypetch (Ton Jakraphan) (Thailand)
 Silver Award:
 Zaya (Belgium: Huang Jia Wei-Morvan-Dargaud Benelux) by Huang Jia Wei (China) Morvan (France)
 Natty (Belgium: Melvil-Corveyran-Dargaud Benelux) by Melvil - Corveyran (France)
 Running on empty by Kim Jea-eon (Republic of Korea)

2010
189 entries from 39 countries and regions were received
 Gold Award: 
 Si loin et si proche by Zhang Xiaobai (Belgium)
 Silver Award:
 Face cachée by Olivier Martin and Sylvain Runberg (France)
 La Isla sin Sonrisa by Enrique Fernández (Spain)
 "The story begins with ..." by Veerachai Duangpla (Thailand)
 Bronze Award:
 Dolltopia (United States) by Abby Denson
 Kylooe (Belgium) by Little Thunder (China)
 The little polar bear (Taiwan) by Chang Fung-Chih
 Pandora (Thailand) by Akekarat Milintapas
 The passionate sword (Thailand) by Yeh Yu Tung, Syu Shu Hao (Taiwan)
 Samurai (France) by Frédéric Genet (artist, Belgium), Jean-François di Giorgio (author, France)

2011
145 entries from 30 countries and regions were received
 Gold Award:
 I Kill Giants by Joe Kelly (USA) and JM Ken Niimura (Spain)
 Silver Award:
 When You Standing Your Tiptoes by Pan Li-Ping and Zu Le-ya (China)
 Make a wish! Da Xi by Cory (Taiwan)
 The Man Who Follow His Own Voice by Tanis Werasakwong (Thailand)
 Bronze Award:
 A Letter To Father (Malaysia) by Chong Chiew Choy
 Conversations Between Me and You (Thailand) by Tongkarn
 Dream Land (Taiwan) by We We
 Ice Cream Baby (Malaysia) by Neko/Chang Lee Ying
 NNN (Canada) by Dan Kim
 Pelangi di Naungan Mentari (Rainbow Under the Sun) (Indonesia) by Indra Wisnu Wardhana (artist), Dimas Adi Saputro (author)
 Summer in Vale・Boll bride (China) by Yang Xiao-ru
 Tokyoland (France) by Benjamin Reiss
 Security Gard (China) by Han Zu-zheng
 X-Venture: Terror Raptor (Malaysia) by Tan Zien Yun (artist), Sherlock (author)

2012
245 entries from 38 countries and regions were received
Gold Award:
 Listening to the Bell (Thailand) by Kosin Jeenseekong
Silver Award:
 Melon Seed School Vol. 3 (Thailand) by Ittiwat Suriyamart
 Floating Flower (China) by Yao Wei
 5 minutes before airing (Indonesia) by Muhammad Fathanatul Haq, Ockto Baringbing 
Bronze Award:
 Once Again (China) by Buddy, Feng Xi Shen Lei 
 Charge ~ beyond ~ (China) by Han Zu Zheng
 Oldman (Taiwan) by Chang Sheng
 Scralls of A Northern City (Taiwan) by Akru
 From The Netherworld : Tales of Terror! (Malaysia) by Puyuh, Core
 Dragon Land (Vietnam) by Dimensional Art, Dinh viet Phuong, Do Nhu Trang, Le Lam Vien
 Once Upon a Time of Love (Thailand) by Amp, Varacha pansang
 Eros/Psyche (Spain) by Maria Llovet 
 Xiao Ou, volume 2, Un monde en double (China) by Wei Song
 Otaku Blue (France) by Malo Kerfriden, Richard Marazano
 The ten rituals of the initiation (Burkina Faso) by Boureima NABALOUM

2013
This year, 256 entries from 53 countries and regions were made. The largest number of application was received from Thailand (47), followed by Taiwan (36), and Indonesia (21).

Gold Award: Bokbig (Thailand) by Prema Jatukanyaprateep
Silver Award:
 Paris (USA) by George Alexopoulos
 Carrier (China) by Naver
 Les Folies Bergère (Belgium) by Francis Porcel (Spain), Zidrou (Belgium)
Bronze Award:
 Pandism (Virus Panda) (Thailand) by Pittaya Werasakwong
 User, Volume 1 (Malaysia) by Zint
 Ten Sticks And One Rice (Singapore) by Koh Hong Teng, Oh Yong Hwee
 City of Darkness (Hong Kong, China) by Andy Seto, Yuyi
 The director against the whip (Burkina Faso) by Kondi Sambu Cypriano
 Something Between (China) by Zhi Ying
 Lead of the soul (China) by chiya, Ke Han, Yi Sha
 Boonhome (Thailand) by Ruangsak Duangpla
 D day (Thailand) by Art Jeeno
 The bear's skin by Oriol (Spain), Zidrou (Belgium)
 It's your world (Japan) by Junko Kawakami

2014
There were 317 entries from 46 countries and regions.
Gold Award:
 Bumbardai (Mongolia) by Nambaral Erdenebayar
Silver Award:
 Mr. Bear (China) by Luo mu
 Atan (Malaysia) by Ben Wong
 Room (Taiwan) by 61Chi
Bronze Award:
 The Moaaga Prince (Burkina-Faso) by Cyprien Kondi Sambu
 Before the rainy evening (China) by Buddy
 Beyond the Cloud (China) by Xi jiu
 Syncopated Dreams by Laurent Bonneau （Germany）, Mathilde Ramadier (France)
 The director against the whip (Burkina Faso) by Kondi Sambu Cypriano
 Only Human (Indonesia) by Mukhlis Nur
 13:05 (Jordan) by Amani Badran
 Summer Shroud (Russia) by Ilya Kuvshinov
 Another World, It Exists. (Saudi Arabia) by SaKooo SHS
 Pretty Deadly by Emma Ríos (Spain), Kelly Sue DeConnick (USA)
 The Vice Squad Jordi Lafebre (Spain), Zidrou (Belgium)
 Juice 1 (Thailand) by Art Jeeno

2015
There were 259 entries from 46 countries and regions.
Gold Award:
 The Divine (Israel) by Asaf Hanuka, Tomer Hanuka & Boaz Lavie
Silver Award:
 Demo＃1 vol. 1 (Taiwan) by Rockat
 Holy Dragon Imperator (Vietnam) by Nguyen Thanh Phong & Nguyen Khanh Duong
 Ichthyophobia (Taiwan) by Li Lung-chieh 
Bronze Award:
 Symbol Sentences (Thai) by Munin
 Skｙ whale (Ukraine) by Lisa Cloud, Tori
 Her Majesty (Taiwan) by Chang, Szu-Ya, Chen Yung Shen
 Happiness Seasonings (Taiwan) by Ruan, Guang-Min
 Inspiration (Russia) by Dzi
 SQ beginning with your name (Russia) by Tan Jiu
 Silver Ocean (China) by Starry
 My Unforgettable Single Life (Thai) by Plariex
 To The More (China) by Ba Wang
 Adjame's Thief (Côte d'Ivoire) by Tape Zato

2016
There were 296 entries from 55 countries and regions.
 Gold Award:
 The Master of Arms (Belgium) by Joël Parnotte & Xavier Dorison
 Silver Award:
 Scavengers (China) by HAN Zuzheng
 The Heart of Darkness (Belgium) by Laura Iorio, Roberto Ricci & Marco Cosimo D'amico
 Gateway to Underworld (Vietnam) by Can Tieu Hy
 Bronce Award:
 King of Vampires (Thailand) by Mangkorn Soraphon, Wipaporn & Rutchote
 Evil Discus (Thailand) by Wiroj (Beast) Ruengsiri
 Secrets of the Ninja (United States) by Akiko Shimojima (Japan) & Sean Michael Wilson (United Kingdom)
 TsangyangGyatso (China) by Zhao Ze & Guo Qiang
 Raruurien (Indonesia) by Ann Maulina
 Tebori (France) by Toledano (Spain) & Robledo (Spain)
 Summer Temple Festival I (Taiwan) by Zuo Hsuan
 Tussles Against Spectres (Korea) by Youngoh Kim
 Dream About Japan (Poland) by Patrycja Kicyla
 Woelan (Indonesia) by Dimaz Sadewa

2017
There were 326 entries from 60 countries and regions.
 Gold Award:
 Two Aldos (Colombia) by Pablo Guerra & Henry Díaz
 Silver Award:
 Onibi (France) by Atelier Sento
 Viva Eve! Long Libe Life! (Ukraine) by Rerekina Natalliia & Martynenko Nataliia
 Left Hand Vol. 1 (Taiwan) by Sally
 Bronce Award: 
 Mightier (United Arab Emirates) By Ahmed Mohammed Al Ali & Mohammed Yousef Al Meraikhi
 Secret Weapon (China / Hong Kong) by Dai Hing Yin
 Mandela (United Kingdom) by Umlando Wezithombe (Republic of South Africa), Santa Buchanan & Nelson Mandela Foundation
 Clearsky city (China) by BigN
 Dutchman in Formosa (Taiwan) by Kinono
 Cat Swordsman (Taiwan) by Yu-Yung Yeh
 Westward (China) by Guangzhou Baiman Culture Communication Co. Ltd & Eric Cheng
 The art of Laziness (Thailand) by Patcharakan Pisansupong
 On This Day (Thailand) by Mork
 Based on True Stories (Thailand) by Gawin Satawut
 Gung Ho - 3 (France) by Thomas Von Kummant (Germany) & Benjamin Von Eckartsberg (Germany)

2018
Winners from 2019.
 Gold Award:
 Yang Hao and his four compositions (China) by Tang Xiao (Dani)
 Silver Award:
 Miseyieki (England) by Shangomola Edunjobi
 The Pork Chops Inferno (Hong Kong) by Lai Tat Tat Wing
 Planned Obsolescence of our feelings (Belgium) by Aimée de Jongh and Zidrou

 Bronze Award: 
 Teng snakes (China) by Feng
 They say the village is haunted (Malaysia) by Yap Zhuo Yu（Malaysia）
 A Través Del Khamsin (Spain) de Marta Salmons
 Flick Royale (Indonesia) Beatrice Nauli
 Romaria (Brazil) by Alexandre Carvalho
 Desert Wolf (Hongkong) by Jack Fung
 Ordinary Days in Taipei (Taiwan) by 61Chi
 Nightlights (Colombia) by Loreana Alvarez Gómez
 Music Of the Fairy Tales (China) by Chiya and Shi Yuyan
 Shi (Belgium, France) by Josep Homs and Zidrou
 1661 Koxinga Z (Taiwan) by Li Lung-chieh（Taiwan

2019
 Gold Award
 Piece of Mind (Manga) (Israel) by Guy Lenman and Nimrod Frydman

 Silver Award
 My little kitchen in summer season (Thailand) by Pitsinee Tangkittinun
 Korokke and the girl who said no (Spain) by Jonatan Cantero and Josep Busquet
 Ye (Brazil) by Guilherme Petreca

 Bronze Award
 Detektif Hantu : Kesumat (Malaysia) by Leoz 
 Palma Sola (Dominican Republic) by Gabriel Castillo and Gerardo Castillo
 Mi Xian Yin: Chinese Folk Tales (China) by 采蘑菇的司马公公（China）
 Migrant (Republic of Benin) by Gjimm Mokoo 
^ Chunxue (China)by 王宇涵
 Merman in the pool (China) by 李嫣然 
 Rites of Passage (Brazil) by Lucas Marques
 Erasmus Song (Portugal) by Daniela Viçoso
 DiKiXi - The Reconciliation (Angola) by Bomcomix e Gildo Pimentel 
 Tao Zero (Hong Kong) by 麥天傑
 Sometimes in the City (Taiwan) by 61Chi

2020
 Gold Award
 Funeral Director (Taiwan) by 韋蘺若明

 Silver Award
 A graphic novel adaptation by Ruan Guang-Min of selected stories from THE ILLUSIONIST ON THE SKYWALK AND OTHER STORIES by Wu Ming-Yi (Taiwan) by 阮光民 and 呉明益
 THE　MUSE (Spain) by ORIOL and ZIDROU
 NANHAO AND SHANGFENG (China) by 布朗尼

 Bronze Award
 INTRANSEXTELLAR (Spain) by Jimi Macías
 The Umbrella (China) by 魏瑩 and 郑柳沁
 Fujie and Mikito (Brazil) by Marcelo Costa and Yuri Andrey
 Nina in the underworld: rat is cat to rat (Brazil) by Pedro Sotto
 Gatherer of the Birds (Ukraine) by Nataliia Rerekina and Gilbert Brissen
 MURENA 10 (Italy) by THEO and JEAN DUFAUX
 EPSILON (Thailand) by YGGO 
 STRANGE TALES OF WALLED CITY (Hong Kong) by REX KOO
 Falling in Love (China) by 吉川流
 BLOSSOM (Taiwan) by D.S.
 JUICE 3 ARRIVALS (Thailand) by Art Jeeno

2021 

 Gold Award
 
 Silver Award
 
 
 
 Bronze Award

See also

 List of manga awards

References

External links

First International Manga Award (Ministry of Foreign Affairs)

Awards established in 2007
International art awards
Japanese art awards
Manga awards
Comics awards
2007 establishments in Japan
Arts organizations based in Japan
Annual events in Japan